São Raimundo (Portuguese for "Saint Raymond") may refer to:

Brazil 
 São Raimundo das Mangabeiras, Maranhão
 São Raimundo do Doca Bezerra, Maranhão
 São Raimundo Nonato, Piauí
 Roman Catholic Diocese of São Raimundo Nonato, a diocese located in São Raimundo Nonato, Brazil

Sports 
 São Raimundo Esporte Clube (AM), a football (soccer) club from Manaus, Brazil
 São Raimundo Esporte Clube (RR), a football (soccer) club from Boa Vista, Brazil
 São Raimundo Esporte Clube (PA), a football (soccer) club from Santarém, Brazil

See also 

 San Raimundo, a town in Guatemala
 San Ramón (disambiguation)